The Akaflieg Berlin B3 Charlotte II was a glider built in Germany in the 1920s. It featured a high-wing, tailless sailplane configuration of all-wood construction, which had a single skid for landing and applied brakes.

Specifications

References

1920s German sailplanes
Akaflieg Berlin aircraft
Aircraft first flown in 1923
Tailless aircraft